Metropolis Theatre may refer to:

Metropolis Theatre (Bronx, New York)
Metropolis Theatre (Montreal), site where Joe Satriani's Satchurated: Live in Montreal was recorded

See also 
 Metropol Theater (disambiguation)